Sıtkı Akçatepe (1902–1985) was a famous Turkish actor. He was known for starring in the acclaimed Hababam Sınıfı series of comedy films. He was the father of actor Halit Akçatepe by his wife Leman Akçatepe, to whom he was married until his death.

Filmography

References

External links

Profile, findagrave.com; accessed 3 April 2017. 
Sitki Akçatepe at sinematurk
Sitki Akçatepe at sinemalar
Sitki Akçatepe at intersinema
Sitki Akçatepe at criticker
Sitki Akçatepe at sinemadevri

1902 births
1985 deaths
Male actors from Istanbul
Turkish male film actors
20th-century Turkish male actors